Brookfield is an unincorporated community in Moral Township, Shelby County, in the U.S. state of Indiana.

History
Brookfield had its start in the early 1850s, when the railroad was extended to that point. A post office was established at Brookfield in 1859 and remained in operation until it was discontinued in 1904.

Geography

References

Unincorporated communities in Shelby County, Indiana
Unincorporated communities in Indiana